"Havana" is a song recorded by Cuban-American singer Camila Cabello featuring fellow American rapper Young Thug. It was released on August 3, 2017, along with "OMG", from her solo debut album, Camila (2018). It was initially released as a promotional single, then was serviced to radio on September 8, 2017, as a single. Due to its rising success, "Havana" later became the official lead single of Camila, replacing "Crying in the Club". In November 2017, a remix version of the song with Puerto Rican rapper Daddy Yankee was uploaded to Cabello's YouTube page. The first verse of the remix is sung in Spanish while Daddy Yankee replaces Young Thug's verse.

"Havana" received critical acclaim with music critics calling the song "sultry" and "bouncy". "Havana" peaked at the top of the Billboard Hot 100. Outside of the United States, "Havana" topped the charts in 23 countries worldwide, including Australia, Canada, Chile, France, and the United Kingdom. It is certified Diamond in six countries. Its music video, directed by Dave Meyers, shows Cabello playing herself as Karla, as well as a telenovela actress and a film protagonist. It won the Video of the Year award at the 2018 MTV Video Music Awards, receiving three other nominations. A vertical video, directed by Sam Lecca, was released on November 10, 2017, on Cabello's official Vevo account. The clip shows the singer and several dancers in the New York City Subway. The clip was previously a Spotify exclusive.

Cabello performed "Havana" at several award shows, including the 2017 MTV Europe Music Awards, the 2018 iHeartRadio Music Awards, and the 2018 Billboard Music Awards. In September 2018, Cabello released a live version of the song featuring her solo performance. The live version of the song would later be nominated for a Grammy Award for Best Pop Solo Performance at the 61st Annual Grammy Awards. It was the best-selling digital single of 2018 according to the International Federation of the Phonographic Industry (IFPI), with equivalent sales of 19 million units worldwide.

"Havana" was certified Diamond by the Recording Industry Association of America in October 2021 for selling 10,000,000 units, making Cabello the first Hispanic singer to achieve this milestone.

Composition
"Havana" is a salsa-inspired mid-tempo pop and Latin song with R&B-pop beats, on which Cabello embraces her Cuban heritage. Cabello sings the chorus over Latin-influenced piano riffs and rhythm, with the melody's chord progression constantly switching between Gm—E—D7 and Gm—Emaj7—D7. It has the same slinky, snap-accented intro as "Same Old Love" by Selena Gomez, released two years before. Camila's vocals span from the low note of G3 to the high note of D5. Sadie Bell of Billboard interpreted the line "Half of my heart is in Havana" as the song chronicling "a romance that found Cabello's heart left down south", while for Rolling Stones Brittany Spanos said that in the "clubby, smooth" track, Cabello falls in love with "a mysterious suitor from East Atlanta", though she has left her heart in her hometown. Young Thug performs a sing-song verse over the "bouncy" piano. Rap-Up described the song as a "Latin fusion", and XXL called it a "straightforward pop track". The second verse featuring Young Thug is replaced with the original lyrics sung by Cabello.

Critical reception
Jamieson Cox of Pitchfork regarded the "sultry, salsa-inflected" song as a "keystone for a superstar origin story." Writing for Billboard, Sadie Bell said that the "sexy" track radiates a "Latin flare". Similarly, Much's Allison Bowsher opined the track "arrives just in time to keep the summer heat going on the radio." Raise Bruner of Time wrote that "Havana" "hits a freshly sultry note that we hope to see more of in her debut album." Peter Berry of XXL felt that Young Thug's verse "blends with the bouncy piano perfectly." Billboard considered it the 19th best song released in 2017, with Lyndsey Havens writing that the song "didn't arrive like a breakthrough hit, but it ended up changing the entire course" of Cabello's solo career, as she "sheds the weight that came with trying to prove herself outside of her former girl group and clears a path to finally be herself." Popjustice ranked it 19th, while The Fader ranked it 48th. Stephen Kearse of Complex, which ranked the song 28th, wrote: "Warm, bouncy, nostalgic, and sweaty, 'Havana' builds a one-night stand into a pulsating fever dream that blurs reality and fantasy", praising Cabello's "layered vocals" and Young Thug's presence.

Accolades

Chart performance
In the United Kingdom, "Havana" entered the UK Singles Chart at number 53 on the chart dated August 11, 2017. It rose to number two in its ninth week, behind only Post Malone's "Rockstar" featuring 21 Savage. On November 3, it reached number one, giving Cabello and Young Thug their first UK number-one single. It then held the top position for five weeks before falling behind Ed Sheeran's "Perfect".

In October 2017, the single reached number seven on the US Billboard Hot 100 in its twelfth week, becoming Cabello's second top 10 entry as a solo artist and Young Thug's first. In January 2018, "Havana" reached number one on the Hot 100 for one week after spending seven non-consecutive weeks occupying the number two spot behind both Post Malone and 21 Savage's "Rockstar" for five weeks and Ed Sheeran and Beyoncé's "Perfect Duet" for an additional two weeks, becoming both Cabello and Young Thug's first song to top the chart. The song took 23 weeks to reach the top spot, equaling the longest climb for a female artist with Sia's "Cheap Thrills" (2016) and Patti Austin's "Baby, Come to Me" (1982–1983). Cabello became the third artist in chart history to top both the Hot 100 and Billboard 200 for their first time in the same week, after Britney Spears and Beyoncé did so in 1999 and 2003, respectively. The song has also been certified Diamond by the Recording Industry Association of America (RIAA). "Havana" became the ninth song to top the Mainstream Top 40, Rhythmic and Adult Top 40 airplay charts–over the 22 years that all three charts have coexisted.

"Havana" reached number one on the Australian ARIA Singles Chart in its twelfth week on the chart, becoming Cabello's first number-one song, including during her time as part of Fifth Harmony. It held the summit for three weeks before also being displaced by "Perfect".

The song became Spotify's most-streamed song ever by a solo female artist in June 2018, with more than one billion streams at the time.

Music video

Background
Cabello shared a 26-second preview of the short film for "Havana" on October 22, 2017, through her YouTube channel. The video featured appearances by Lele Pons as Bella, LeJuan James as Abuelita, Noah Centineo as Cabello's love interest, Marco DelVecchio as the twins Juan and Rodrigo and Mikey Pesante as the dancer. It was directed by Dave Meyers and was released on October 24, 2017. Young Thug also appears in the video.

Synopsis

The main song starts late but the music video starts with Karla, played by Cabello, watching a telenovela, before being interrupted by her grandmother, who turns off the TV and advises her to live her life instead of spending her days indoors. Karla then leaves the house to go see a movie. The film she is watching, called Camila in Havana, takes the form of a music video, starring a version of herself wearing a fringe-covered red dress and performing at a club. Aside from appearing as Karla, Cabello also plays the telenovela actress and the movie protagonist. After the film ends, she leaves the cinema and stumbles across a cyclist, also the male protagonist of the film, and begins dancing with him.

Reception
Tom Breihan of Stereogum, which ranked the song 28th of 50 best music videos of 2017, reviewed on December 18, 2017: "Camila Cabello is going to be a movie star one day, and she might still never deliver a better performance than the one she gives in this multiple-role video."

It received four nominations at the 2018 MTV Video Music Awards, for Video of the Year, Song of the Year, Best Pop Video, and Best Choreography, winning the first.

As of November 25, 2021, the video has received more than 1 billion views on YouTube, while the audio track has over 1.8 billion views, a total of 2.8 billion.

Live performances and remixes
Cabello performed the song for the first time on television on The Tonight Show Starring Jimmy Fallon on September 25, 2017. The same week she performed on The Today Show, where she delivered a message to "all the dreamers" in support of the Deferred Action for Childhood Arrivals. On October 27, Cabello performed a Spanglish version of the song at the Latin American Music Awards. She also performed the song at the BBC Radio 1's Teen Awards, LOS40 Music Awards iHeartRadio Fiesta Latina, and the MTV Europe Music Awards. Her performance at the MTV EMAs was ranked as the best of the night by Billboard writer Joe Lynch. Her performance at Billboard Women in Music was the stripped-down version of the song, backed only by a guitar, keyboard and light drumming. It was also performed at Dick Clark's New Year's Rockin' Eve in 2017, and later she gave a cabaret-style performance on The Ellen DeGeneres Show during the album release week. She gave a performance inspired by Marilyn Monroe's Gentlemen Prefer Blondes role and Madonna's "Material Girl" music video at the 2018 iHeartRadio Music Awards with Young Thug. Cabello performed the song with Ricky Martin, J Balvin, Young Thug and Arturo Sandoval as the opening act at the 61st Annual Grammy Awards in February 2019. On May 28, 2022, Cabello performed the song in the 2022 UEFA Champions League Final.

Several remixes of the song have been made. On November 11, 2017, a remix made by Puerto Rican rapper Daddy Yankee was published on Cabello's official YouTube channel. The first verse of the remix is sung in Spanish while Daddy Yankee replaces Young Thug's verse. The video has 142 million views as of January 18, 2023. Additionally, a popular remix made by YouTuber Maestro Ziikos was uploaded to YouTube on November 24 which was a remix that featured then U.S President Donald Trump "singing" (the remix was made via taking excerpts from various Trump speeches and adjusting their tone to the song). Though the song was generally praised for the effort that went into it, Cabello herself, as a critic of Trump due to his plans to rescind DACA, was displeased with the remix, and after fans repeatedly asked her about it, she took to Twitter to apologize to the city of Havana for the remix. The Trump remix has 132 million views as of January 18, 2023.

Awards and nominations

Track listing

Digital download
"Havana" (featuring Young Thug) – 3:36

Digital download – Daddy Yankee remix
"Havana" (Remix) with Daddy Yankee – 3:19

Digital download – original version
"Havana" (No Rap Version) – 2:54

Digital download – live version
"Havana" (Live) – 4:08

CD single
"Havana" (featuring Young Thug) – 3:36
"Havana" (Remix) with Daddy Yankee – 3:19

Credits and personnel
Credits from the liner notes of Camila and adapted from Jaxsta.

Studio recording
 Camila Cabello's vocals recorded at NightBird Recording Studios (West Hollywood, California)
 Young Thug's vocals recorded at Westlake Recording Studios (West Hollywood, California)
 Camila Cabello's vocals produced at TwentyNine Lions (Studio City, California)
 Mixed at Larrabee Sound Studios (North Hollywood, California)
 Mastered at The Mastering Place (New York City)

Personnel
Performance
Camila Cabello – lead vocals
 Young Thug – guest vocals
 Pharrell Williams – background vocals
 Starrah – background vocals
Frank Dukes – piano, bass, programming
Kaan Gunesberk – keyboards
Serafin Aguilar – trumpet
Tom Moffett – trumpet
Leland Whitty – saxophone

Production and songwriting
 Frank Dukes – production, songwriting
 Matt Beckley – vocal production, songwriting
Camila Cabello – songwriting
Kaan Gunesberk – songwriting
 Brian Lee – songwriting
 Starrah – songwriting
 Ali Tamposi – songwriting
 Andrew Watt – songwriting
Pharrell Williams – songwriting
 Young Thug – songwriting

Technical
 Martin Gray – recording
 Mike Gaydusek – recording
 Robbie Soukiasyan – recording
 Kyle Mann – recording
 Marco Falcone – assistant recording
 Sean Madden – assistant recording
 Henry Guevara – assistant recording
 Jaycen Joshua – mixing
 David Nakaji – assistant mixing
 Ivan Jimenez – assistant mixing
 Dave Kutch – mastering

Live version
Credits adapted from Tidal.
 Camila Cabello – vocals
 Ryan Cecil – recording
 Michelle Mancini – mastering
 Serban Ghenea – mixing

Charts

Weekly charts

Monthly charts

Year-end charts

Decade-end charts

Certifications

Release history

See also

 List of best-selling singles worldwide by year
 List of Billboard Hot 100 number-one singles of 2018
 List of Billboard Digital Song Sales number-one singles of 2017
 List of Billboard Radio Songs number-one singles of 2017
 List of Billboard Streaming Songs number-one singles of 2018
 List of Billboard Adult Top 40 number-one songs of 2018
 List of Billboard Mainstream Top 40 number-one songs of 2017
 List of Billboard Mainstream Top 40 number-one songs of 2018
 List of Billboard Rhythmic number-one songs of 2018
 List of Billboard Dance/Mix Show Airplay number-one songs of 2017
 List of Canadian Hot 100 number-one singles of 2017
 List of Canadian Hot 100 number-one singles of 2018
 List of UK Singles Chart number ones of 2017
 List of number-one hits of 2018 (France)
 List of airplay number-one hits of the 2010s (Argentina)
 List of number-one singles of 2017 (Australia)
 List of number-one digital tracks of 2017 (Australia)
 List of number-one digital tracks of 2018 (Australia)
 List of number-one singles of 2017 (Ireland)
 List of number-one songs of 2017 (Mexico)
 List of number-one singles of 2017 (Poland)
 List of number-one singles of 2018 (Portugal)
 List of number-one singles of 2017 (Scotland)
 List of number-one singles of 2017 (Slovenia)
 List of number-one international songs of 2018 (South Korea)
 List of best-selling singles in South Korea by year

References

2017 songs
2017 singles
Camila Cabello songs
Young Thug songs
Daddy Yankee songs
Songs written by Camila Cabello
Songs written by Young Thug
Songs written by Pharrell Williams
Songs written by Frank Dukes
Songs written by Starrah
Songs written by Ali Tamposi
Songs written by Brian Lee (songwriter)
Songs written by Andrew Watt (record producer)
Songs written by Louis Bell
Songs written by Daddy Yankee
Spanglish songs
Music videos directed by Dave Meyers (director)
Number-one singles in France
Number-one singles in Australia
Number-one singles in Romania
Billboard Hot 100 number-one singles
Canadian Hot 100 number-one singles
Number-one singles in Greece
Number-one singles in Argentina
Number-one singles in Hungary
Irish Singles Chart number-one singles
Number-one singles in Israel
Number-one singles in Poland
Number-one singles in Portugal
Number-one singles in Scotland
UK Singles Chart number-one singles
Songs about cities
Songs about Cuba
Torch songs
MTV Video of the Year Award
Song recordings produced by Frank Dukes
Epic Records singles
Syco Music singles